Thomas Jonathan Burrill (April 25, 1839 – April 14, 1916) was an American botanist, plant pathologist, and college administrator who first discovered bacterial causes for plant disease. He introduced Erwinia amylovora (called by him Micrococcus amylovorus) as the causal agent of pear fire blight.

Born in Pittsfield, Massachusetts, he moved with his family at age 9 to a farm in Stephenson County, Illinois. Burrill graduated Illinois State Normal University in 1865. He then worked for two years as superintendent of the Urbana public schools. In 1867, he was selected by John Wesley Powell to be the botanist for an expedition to the Colorado Rocky Mountains.

After the Colorado expedition, Burrill began teaching algebra as an assistant professor in 1869. He soon switched to teaching botany and by 1870 was promoted to professor. In 1868, he was elected professor of botany and horticulture at University of Illinois and remained there the rest of his career, eventually serving as Vice President in 1882. Burrill served as acting regent of the University of Illinois from 1891 until 1894.

References

External links
Thomas J. Burrill Papers, 1901-1905;1909-1910
Correspondence, 1892, 1894

1839 births
1916 deaths
American botanists
American phytopathologists
Illinois State University alumni
Leaders of the University of Illinois
People from Pittsfield, Massachusetts